Dunmore MacHales GAA is a Gaelic Athletic Association club based in Dunmore, County Galway, Ireland. The club is a member of Galway GAA. Teams at underage and Intermediate level play in the Galway League and Championships.
Though the McHales are the first team to have won the Galway Senior Championship in 1889 the club has not won the Frank Fox cup in almost four decades, last winning the championship in 1983.

History
They were the first team to win the Galway Senior Football Championship in 1889 and have had many victories in the competition ever since although their last senior county title was won in 1983. They last appeared in the final in 1997. They are fourth in the all-time list of most victories.

They had two great decades, the first coming from 1900 to 1912, and the 1960s when they won five of the ten championships. They contributed five players to the Galway team that won "three-in-a-row team" in 1964, 1965 and 1966.

For the first time since 1973, the club secured its first county Galway Minor Championship in September 2012 with a 2-10 to 2-06 victory over St James'.

On the 24th of October 2021 at Tuam Stadium, Dunmore MacHales GAA bridged a 48-Year gap for underage ‘A’ silverware.

The MacHales came through a dramatic penalty shoot-out to win the North Board U-19 ‘A’ Football title against Claregalway, securing a first underage ‘A’ title since 1973.

The game finished 1-06 to 0-09, after extra-time, in Tuam Stadium before Dunmore prevailed 4-2 on penalties.

Notable players
Michael Donnellan won an All-Ireland Senior Football Championship medal with the Galway Senior football team in 1925. He died in Croke Park at the 1964 All-Ireland final, shortly before his son, John Donnellan, as victorious Galway captain, received the Sam Maguire Cup. He captained the Galway winning team in 1964, the first of a historic "3 In A Row". His brother, Patrick (Pateen) was also on the team. 
Michael Donnellan, son on John Donnellan, won two All-Ireland titles in 1998 and 2001. The Armagh footballer Oisín McConville once said of him: "He was the best athlete I've ever played against". His run of the full length of the pitch to assist Seán Óg de Paor was voted the best moment in the history of GAA. He later moved to Salthill-Knocknacarra in 2003 and won an All-Ireland club medal in 2006.

Facilities

Páirc Mhic Éil is the home pitch of Dunmore MacHales since 1973, before this it was called "the Demesne" or "The Captain's".

Honours
Galway Senior Club Football Championship (15)
 1889, 1891, 1900, 1902, 1907, 1910, 1912, 1953, 1961, 1963, 1966, 1968, 1969, 1973, 1983
 Galway Intermediate Club Football Championship Championship (1)
 2022 
 Connacht Intermediate Club Football Championship (1) 
 2022
 Galway Minor Football Championship (2) 
 1973, 2012
 Galway U19 Football Championship    (1)
 2021

Gaelic games clubs in County Galway
Gaelic football clubs in County Galway